Gidget Grows Up is a 1969 American made-for-television comedy film directed by James Sheldon with stars Karen Valentine, Edward Mulhare and Paul Petersen as well as alphabetically listed special guest stars Warner Anderson, Bob Cummings, Nina Foch and Paul Lynde. Freely adapted from the novel Gidget Goes New York by Frederick Kohner, the film premiered on ABC on December 30, 1969, and was intended as a pilot for a possible new Gidget series, possibly a sequel to the 1960s sitcom Gidget.

Plot
After two years of college abroad, Gidget returns to Santa Monica.  She discovers that the letters she wrote to her boyfriend Jeff, intended to make him jealous, have backfired, and her attempts to patch things up with him are rebuffed.  Inspired by a speech she hears on television made by the United States Ambassador to the United Nations, she hops a bus to New York City to work for the United Nations.

She meets the Ambassador, who finds her a job, but because she has only two years of college education, the best position the United Nations will offer her is tour guide.  She meets and has a fling with Alex Mac Laughlin, an Australian agronomist who finds her and two of her fellow employees an inexpensive Greenwich Village apartment, managed by the eccentric Louis B. Latimer, a grown child actor has-been attempting a comeback as an independent film director.

Gidget has a number of comical and romantic adventures before being reunited with former boyfriend Jeff.

Cast
 Karen Valentine as Gidget
 And Edward Mulhare as Alex Mac Laughlin
 Co-Starring Paul Petersen as MoondoggieSpecial Guest Starsin alphabetical order
 Warner Anderson as Ambassador Post
 Bob Cummings as Russ Lawrence
 Nina Foch as Bibi Crosby
 Paul Lynde as Louis B. Latimer

See also
 Gidget (film)
 Gidget Goes Hawaiian
 Gidget Goes to Rome
 Gidget Gets Married
 Gidget's Summer Reunion
 The New Gidget
 List of television films produced for American Broadcasting Company
 United Nations in popular culture

References

External links
 
 
 Gidget Grows Up at OVGuide, eight video clips comprising the entire film, more or less

ABC Movie of the Week
1969 television films
1969 films
Gidget films
Films set in New York City
Films about the United Nations
Television sequel films